Arateh Dasht is a village in Bisheh Sar Rural District, in the Central District of Qaem Shahr County, Mazandaran Province, Iran. At the 2006 census, its population was 45, in 11 families.

References 

 Populated places in Qaem Shahr County